Double Walker is a 2021 American supernatural horror thriller film directed by Colin West, starring Sylvie Mix. The story follows a young ghost (Mix) who investigates her own murder and then takes revenge on the men who were responsible.

It was released in theaters and VOD release in the United States by Cranked Up Films on November 12, 2021.

Reception
The film has an 80 percent rating on Rotten Tomatoes based on 10 reviews.

References

External links

2021 films
2021 horror thriller films
American horror thriller films
2020s English-language films
2020s American films